is a Japanese film director from Tokyo. Tasaki is most known for directing episodes of Pretty Guardian Sailor Moon, Cutie Honey: The Live, and the Super Sentai, Power Rangers, and Kamen Rider series.

Filmography
 series director denoted in bold

TV Series
Kamen Rider Black (1987): Assistant director
Kamen Rider Black RX (1988): Assistant director
Chōriki Sentai Ohranger (1995)
Gekisou Sentai Carranger (1996)
Denji Sentai Megaranger (1997)
Seijuu Sentai Gingaman (1998)
Power Rangers Lost Galaxy (1999)
Power Rangers Lightspeed Rescue (2000)
Kamen Rider Agito (2001)
Kamen Rider Ryuki (2002)
Kamen Rider 555 (2003)
Pretty Guardian Sailor Moon (2003)
Sh15uya (2005)
Kamen Rider Kabuto (2006)
Kamen Rider Den-O (2007)
Cutie Honey: The Live (2007)
Kamen Rider Kiva (2008)
Kamen Rider Decade (2009)
Kamen Rider W (2009-2010)
Kamen Rider OOO (2010-2011)
Kamen Rider Fourze (2011-2012)
Kamen Rider Wizard (2012-2013)
Unofficial Sentai Akibaranger (2012-2013)
Kamen Rider Gaim (2013-2014)
Kamen Rider Drive (2014-2015)
Kamen Rider Ghost (2015-2016)
Kamen Rider Build (2017-2018)
Kamen Rider Zi-O (2018-2019)
Kamen Rider Zero-One (2019-2020)
Kikai Sentai Zenkaiger (2021-2022)
 Avataro Sentai Donbrothers (2022)

Films
Kamen Rider Agito: Project G4 (2001)
Kamen Rider Ryuki: Episode Final (2002)
Kamen Rider 555: Paradise Lost (2003)
Gamera the Brave (2006)
Kamen Rider The Next (2007)
Kamen Rider Kiva: King of the Castle in the Demon World (2008)
Cho Kamen Rider Den-O & Decade Neo Generations: The Onigashima Warship (2009)
Kamen Rider × Kamen Rider W & Decade: Movie War 2010 (2009)
Kamen Rider × Kamen Rider OOO & W Featuring Skull: Movie War Core (2010)
Salvage Mice (2011)
Kamen Rider × Kamen Rider Gaim & Wizard: The Fateful Sengoku Movie Battle (2013)
 Saber + Zenkaiger: Super Hero Senki (2021)

V-Cinema
Ninja Sentai Kakuranger Super Video (1994)
Gekisou Sentai Carranger Super Video (1996)
Denji Sentai Megaranger vs. Carranger (1998)

References

External links

1964 births
Japanese film directors
Living people
People from Tokyo